This is a list of rivers in El Salvador.

El Salvador has 58 river basins which all drain to the Pacific Ocean. The total amount of water discharged into the Pacific is 19 million m³ in a normal year. 
Additionally, there are several endorheic basins linked to a lake. Coatepeque Lake is the largest endorheic basin in the country.

By drainage basin
This list is arranged by drainage basin, with respective tributaries indented under each larger stream's name.

Pacific Ocean

Paz River
Cara Sucia River
Copinula River
Sensunapan River
Banderas River
Pululuya River
Comalapa River
Jiboa River
Lempa River
Torola River
Sumpul River
Ostúa River
Jalponga River
El Guayabo River
El Potrero River
El Molino River
Río Grande de San Miguel
Sirama River
Goascorán River

See also
 List of rivers of the Americas by coastline

References

Rand McNally, The New International Atlas, 1993.
CIA map: :Image:Elsalvador relief map 1980.jpg
, GEOnet Names Server

El Salvador
Rivers
E